Oliver Richard Trethowan Sale (born 30 September 1995) is an English cricketer who plays for Somerset County Cricket Club. On 29 July 2016 he made his Twenty20 debut for Somerset against Hampshire in the 2016 NatWest t20 Blast.

In September 2022, Sale confirmed he would be leaving Somerset at the end of the 2022 season to sign for Northamptonshire.

Early life
Ollie Sale was born on 30 September 1995 in Newcastle-under-Lyme, Staffordshire, England and attended Sherborne School in Sherborne, Dorset.

References

External links
 
 

1995 births
Living people
English cricketers
Somerset cricketers
Sportspeople from Newcastle-under-Lyme
People educated at Sherborne School
Alumni of Newcastle University